Suman Talwar (born 28 August 1959) is an Indian actor known for his work in Telugu, Tamil cinema, Kannada and Hindi. In a career spanning almost 4 decades, he has acted in more than 150 movies. He was one of the most prominent actors of Telugu cinema during the 1980s.

Early life
Suman was born in a Tulu-speaking family in Madras of present-day Tamil Nadu. His mother, Kesari Chandra, was the Principal of the Ethiraj College for women in Chennai. His father, Susheel Chandra, worked for I.O.C. Chennai. He attended The Besant Theosophical High School, Chennai and completed a B.A. in English Literature. Suman learnt music and Sanskrit from H.A.S. Shastri.

Career
Suman started his career in the role of a police officer in the Tamil movie Neechal kulam (1979) produced by T. R. Ramanna. Suman acted as mythological characters such as Venkateswara, Shiva, and Rama in Telugu. He won Nandi Award for Best Actor for the film Bava Bavamaridi in 1993. 

He returned to acting by playing the villain in the Tamil films Sivaji (2007) and Kuruvi.(2008). He was cast as the main antagonist in the Malayalam movie Sagar alias Jacky. Suman also appeared in the independent Hollywood film Death And Taxis in 2004. He has also won the Asianet Film Honour Special Jury Award in 2009.

Politics 
Suman initially started showing his interest in politics by supporting Telugu Desam Party during 1999 under the leadership of the then Chief Minister N. Chandrababu Naidu. In 2004, he, along with his supporters, joined Bharatiya Janata Party.

Personal life 
He is married to Sirisha, and they have a daughter.

Filmography

References

External links

 

Living people
Tulu people
Male actors in Kannada cinema
Male actors in Tamil cinema
Male actors in Malayalam cinema
Filmfare Awards South winners
Male actors in Telugu cinema
Indian male film actors
Nandi Award winners
1959 births
Male actors from Mangalore
20th-century Indian male actors
21st-century Indian male actors